A Cruise in the Albertina (Swedish: På kryss med Albertina) is a 1938 Swedish drama film directed by Per-Axel Branner and starring Adolf Jahr, Signe Wirff and Olav Riégo. The film's sets were designed by the art director Bertil Duroj. Interiors were shot at studios in Djurgården in Stockholm. Location shooting took place in the Baltic Sea, including round Aland.

Cast
 Adolf Jahr as 	John Andersson
 Ulla Wikander as Ann-Marie Blomberg
 Olav Riégo as 	Mr. Blomberg
 Signe Wirff as 	Mrs. Blomberg
 Åke Engfeldtas Karl-Göran Sparrholm
 Emil Fjellström as Jakob
 Otto Landahl as 	Kalle
 Sven-Bertil Norberg as 	First Mate
 Victor Thorén as 	Johan
 Wiola Brunius as 	Black Sonja
 Magnus Kesster as 	Lucas
 Torsten Bergström as 	Fredrik
 John Westin as 	Forwarding Agent
 Bertil Berglund as 	Customs Officer 
 Gösta Bodin as 	Bartender 
 Naemi Briese as Night Club Guest
 Gösta Gustafson as Customs Inspector 
 Ragnar Widestedt as Man sneaking out of nightclub
 Lulu Ziegler as Night Club Singer

References

Bibliography 
 Qvist, Per Olov & von Bagh, Peter. Guide to the Cinema of Sweden and Finland. Greenwood Publishing Group, 2000.
 Wredlund, Bertil & Lindfors, Rolf. Långfilm i Sverige: 1930-1939. Proprius, 1983.

External links 
 

1938 films
Swedish drama films
1938 drama films
1930s Swedish-language films
Films directed by Per-Axel Branner
Seafaring films
1930s Swedish films